Thirteen referendums were held in Switzerland during 2004. The first three were held on 8 February on a counter proposal to the popular initiative "for safe and efficient motorways" (rejected), an amendment to the Obligations (tenancy) law (rejected) and a popular initiative "life-long custody for non-curable, extremely dangerous sexual and violent criminals" (approved). The second set of three was held on 16 May on a revision of the federal law on Aged and Bereaved insurance, a federal resolution on financing the Aged and Bereaved insurance, and a federal law that would affect taxation for married couples, families, private housing and stamp duty, all of which were rejected.

The next four were held on 26 September on a federal resolution on naturalisation (rejected), a federal resolution on third-generation foreigners getting Swiss citizenship (rejected), a popular initiative "postal services for all" (rejected) and a federal law on compensating members of the armed forces for loss of earnings (approved). The final set of referendums was held on 28 November on a federal resolution on rebalancing the financial duties of the Federation and the Cantons, a federal resolution on the constitutional reordering of the budget and a federal law on stem cell research, all of which were approved.

Results

References

2004 elections in Switzerland
2004 referendums
Referendums in Switzerland